Logical Family: A Memoir is a 2017 memoir by author Armistead Maupin. In the book, Maupin recounts growing up as a young conservative in the Southeastern United States and becoming a gay writer in San Francisco, California.

References

2017 non-fiction books
American memoirs
Works by Armistead Maupin
HarperCollins books